The India national under-20 football team, also known as India Under-20s or India U20(s), represents India at all under-20 football tournaments. They act as the main feeder team for the India national under-23 football team and the senior India national football team.

This team is for Indian players aged under 19 at the start of the calendar year in which a two-year AFC U-19 Championship campaign begins, and as such, some players can remain with the squad until the age of 21. As long as they are eligible, players can play for India at any level, making it possible to play for the U19s first, then the senior side, and again back to playing for the U19s. It is also possible to play for one country at youth level and another at senior level (provided the player is eligible).

History

As an Asian U19 team, India competes for the Asian Championship, with the finals every even-numbered year, formerly odd-numbered years. There is no Under-19 World Cup, although there is an Under-20 World Cup. This team also participate in the SAFF U-19 Championship which started from 2015 by South Asian Football federation.

1959−1970
For the first four seasons of AFC U-19 Championship, from 1959 to 1962 the Indian team did not enter into the tournament though there was no qualification round. India first participated in the AFC U-19 Championships in 1963 but did not move ahead from the group stage. 1964 is where the first Kabui player, BasantaKumar Kabui represented Manipur in an International event.

The first best result came at the 1966 edition where the team entered in the quarter finals with 3 wins against Burma, Japan and Singapore and a defeat by china but in the quarter final they lost to Israel by 4−0. In the next edition at 1967 AFC Youth Championship India again entered in the quarter final. First a draw of 1−1 against Israel and then defeating Malaysia by 4−1 but same as 1966 they again defeated in the quarter final, this time by Indonesia by 2−6. In 1968, the team didn't move beyond group stage, and next two edition of 1969 and 1970 India did not enter in the championships.

1971−1979
In 1971, they again reached the quarter final for the third time in AFC championships, but the fate was same as again saw a defeat, now against Japan by 0−3. But, after a gap of two more edition, it was 1974 AFC Youth Championship, where India seen the golden moment after becoming champions in AFC Under-19 Championships. First in group stage India defeat both Laos and Burma by 1−0 and a draw against Hong Kong by 2−2. Then entering in the quarter final they defeated Singapore by 1(4)−1(1), thus reached semi-finals where defeating Thailand by 2−1, for the first time India reached the final of the Championship. But the final was a draw against Iran by 2−2 thus jointly awarded both the team as the Champions. In 1975 and 1976 edition, India didn't do much well but at 1977 AFC Youth Championship they reached the quarter final but the opponent was Iran, the defending Champion who defeated India by 3−0, thus failed to qualify for the first FIFA World Youth Championship in 1977 which later came to be known as FIFA U-20 World Cup and also failed to qualify at the 1979 edition.

1980−2000, the decline
These two decades saw a decline in the performance of the Indian team. Qualification round started from 1980 AFC Youth Championship and India failed to qualify in 6 out of 11 edition of the championships and in rest 5 edition the failed to move beyond the group stage, thus also failed to qualify for the FIFA U-20 World Cup as the finalist were only to be qualified for the competition.

2002−2017 Rise and Fall
In 2002, at the AFC U-19 Championship, India reached the quarter final for the 6th time, by the virtue of third-place qualifiers, but defeated heavily by South Korea, where the Korean found the Indian net 7 times. Next two editions they ended their competition in group stages and next 7 editions from 2008 to 2018, India failed to qualify again for the championships and so for the FIFA U20 Worldcup.

In the meanwhile, SAFF started SAFF U-19 Championship from 2015 to develop the youth teams of South Asian countries as they continuously failing to qualify for AFC U-20 championships. In the 2015 inaugural edition, India became runners-up facing a defeat from Nepal through a penalty shoot out. In the next edition in 2017, the tournament was a round robin, where India saw two wins against Bhutan and Maldives and two defeats from Bangladesh and Nepal, thus achieved the third place in the tournament.

2018−Present
The AIFF finally acted and opened their eyes to bring out the team from its misery and started various plans and programmes to tackle to present a pathetic situation. One of the most important steps is international exposure to the youth and under 17 teams.
India's U-20 team was invited to participate in Cotif Tournament where clubs and national and autonomous teams participate every year since 1984, held at Valencia, Spain. 2018 Cotif was 35th Anniversary of the tournament. Though India lost two consecutive matches against Spanish club Murcia then against Mauritania, they managed a draw against a stronger Latin American side of Venezuela, but on the final group match on 5 August 2018, the Indian side written a piece of history when they defeated the most successful U-20 Worldcup winning nation Argentina. The match was historic in many ways, when Indian defender Deepak Tangri headed a corner kick to the net of Argentine side, it was the first goal against them by any Indian side, then with a second goal by Anwar Ali with a fabulous free kick help India to win the match with a score of 2−1 against the stronger Argentine side, made a history as it is the first time that any Indian team defeated any Argentine side and also any American national team. Argentina national team manager Scaloni and Argentine great Pablo Aimar praised the young colt's performances and said the future of the team is bright if there is continued perseverance. AIFF called it as one of the "biggest days for Indian Football" as team coach said "This victory will definitely earn Indian football more respect in the world of football. It opens up a window of opportunity to test ourselves against the best in the world on a regular basis".

Just after the Cotif experience, AIFF announced the team was invited to play in a four-nation tournament between under-20 national teams of France, Croatia and Slovenia and two friendlies against Serbia. This was the first time India was playing in a 4-nations tournament in which all the opponents are European nations. In the first match the team faced a big defeat against a mightier Croatian team by 0−5. The second match was against Slovenia, where they played very well within 90 minutes but failed to convert various chances and on the last minute of injury time the Slovenian side found the net, match ended in 0−1 defeat. Third match was against France, which India lost by 2−0. In the friendlies against Serbia India saw defeat in both the matches, first by 2−0 and second by 3−1 where Rahim Ali managed to find the net once.

Current staff

Players

Current squad
 The following players were called up for the 2023 AFC U-20 Asian Cup qualification matches.
 Match dates: 14–18 October 2022
 Opposition: ,  and Caps and goals correct as of: 16 October 2022, after the match against 

Past Squads
AFC U-19 Championship squads
 1974 AFC U-19 Championship squad
 2002 AFC U-19 Championship squad

Results and fixtures
For past match results of the national team, see the team's results page.

Matches in the last 12 months, and future scheduled matches

2022

Competitive records

FIFA U-20 World Cup

AFC U-20 Asian Cup

SAFF U-18/U-19/U-20 Championship

*Denotes draws includes knockout matches decided on penalty kicks. Red border indicates that the tournament was hosted on home soil. Gold, silver, bronze backgrounds indicates 1st, 2nd and 3rd finishes respectively. Bold text indicates best finish in tournament.

Other honoursOFC Youth Development TournamentChampions (1):''' 2019

See also

 India national football team
 India national under-23 football team
 India national under-17 football team

External links
 India U-19 team page at the Official AIFF website

References

 
Youth football in India
Football
Asian national under-20 association football teams